Bang! Gunship Elite is a space combat simulator developed by French studio RayLand was released for Windows and Dreamcast. It allows the player to fly a combat spacecraft in a fully 3D environment and fight enemies piloting similar craft to their own.

Plot
The excitement begins when one accepts the controls behind a futuristic space fighter. The war has taken a turn for the worse and fighter pilots are few and scarce in the Twin Suns solar system. The Kha reserves have been drained, and the Alliance has nowhere to turn except to a rookie who must prematurely aid them in the war effort. Players will join this Gunship Elite in order to save the Alliance's crusade and ultimately defeat the Sektar and the bloodthirsty Morgoths. The missions will be complex and next to impossible given the circumstances. Pilots will have to fly solo, kamikaze style, without any tactical support in order to accomplish their mission.

Reception

The game received "mixed or average reviews" on both platforms according to the review aggregation website Metacritic. Jim Preston of NextGen gave both the PC and Dreamcast versions mixed reviews in two separate issues, first calling the former "A gorgeous but simplistic shooter that will give action fans a short yet fun ride" (#70, October 2000); and later saying that the latter "reminds us of the charm of manic shooters from yesteryear, but it also reminds us why we don't play those games anymore" (#74, February 2001).

References

External links

2000 video games
Dreamcast games
Multiplayer and single-player video games
Space combat simulators
Video games developed in France
Windows games
Red Storm Entertainment games